Qeshlaq-e Moinabad (also Romanized as Qeshlāq-e Mo‘īnābād) is a village in Pishva Rural District, in the Central District of Pishva County, Tehran Province, Iran. At the 2006 census, its population was 383, in 93 families.

References 

Populated places in Pishva County